Eusébio da Silva Ferreira  (25 January 1942 – 5 January 2014), nicknamed the "Black Panther", the "Black Pearl" or "O Rei" ("The King"), was a Portuguese footballer who played as a striker. He is considered one of the greatest players of all time as well as Benfica's best player ever. He was known for his speed, technique, athleticism and his ferocious right-footed shot, making him a prolific goalscorer, accumulating 733 goals in 745 matches.

Eusébio helped Portugal reach third place at the 1966 FIFA World Cup, being the top goalscorer of the tournament with nine goals. He won the Ballon d'Or in 1965 and was runner-up in 1962 and 1966. He is Benfica's all-time top scorer with 473 goals in 440 competitive matches. There, his honours include eleven Primeira Liga titles and a European Cup, also being integral in reaching additional European Cup finals in 1963, 1965 and 1968. He is the second-highest goalscorer, behind Alfredo Di Stéfano, in the pre-Champions League era of the European Cup with 48 goals. He was the European Cup top scorer in 1964–65, 1965–66 and 1967–68. He also won the Bola de Prata for the Primeira Liga top scorer a record seven times. He was the first ever player to win the European Golden Boot, in 1968, a feat he replicated in 1973.

From his retirement until his death, Eusébio was an ambassador of football and was one of the most recognizable faces of his generation.  His name often appears in best player of all time lists and polls by football critics and fans. He was elected the ninth-best footballer of the 20th century in a poll by the IFFHS and the tenth-best footballer of the 20th century in a poll by the World Soccer magazine. Pelé named Eusébio as one of the 125 best living footballers in his 2004 FIFA 100 list. He was seventh in the online poll for UEFA Golden Jubilee Poll. In November 2003, to celebrate UEFA's Jubilee, he was selected as the Golden Player of Portugal by the Portuguese Football Federation as their most outstanding player of the past 50 years. Shortly after Eusébio's death, Di Stéfano stated: "For me Eusébio will always be the best player of all time".

Early life
Eusébio was born in the Mafalala neighbourhood, Lourenço Marques (now Maputo), Portuguese Mozambique on 25 January 1942. His parents were Laurindo António da Silva Ferreira, a white railroad worker from Malanje, Angola, and his wife Elisa Anissabeni, a black Mozambican woman. He was the fourth child of his parents. Growing up in an extremely poor neighbourhood, he used to skip school classes to play barefoot football with his friends on improvised pitches and using improvised footballs. His father died from tetanus when Eusébio was eight years old, so the widowed Elisa almost exclusively raised young Eusébio.

Club career

Early career
Eusébio first started to play for a local amateur team called Os Brasileiros (The Brazilians), in honour of the great Brazil national team of the 1950s that he and his friends formed, they would play under the names of some of those superstars. The balls they used were made of socks stuffed with newspapers rolled into spheres. He tried to enlist with some friends for the team Grupo Desportivo de Lourenço de Marques, his favourite team and a Benfica feeder team, also the team where Mário Coluna had played before his move to Benfica, but was rejected, without even being given a chance to prove his worth. He then tried his luck with Sporting Clube de Lourenço Marques, who accepted him. He affirmed that he was spotted by a former Juventus goalkeeper turned scout when he was 15 years old: "When I was 15, Juventus of Italy, wanted to hire me, because one of their scouts, who had been a famous Italian goalkeeper for them, saw me and told them that there was a boy with a potential, that it would be good to take advantage while I was still unknown. Juventus proposed but my mum never wanted to hear anything from anyone".

Eusébio played for two seasons with their youth team, while he made sporadic appearances in the senior team. There he won the Campeonato Provincial de Moçambique and the Campeonato Distrital de Lourenço Marques in his last season, in 1960.

Benfica
Eusébio moved to Lisbon in his late teens, after joining Benfica as an 18-year-old from his local club, Sporting de Lourenço Marques, for 350,000 Portuguese escudos (equivalent to €136,000 in 2009). Benfica discovered Eusébio due to the efforts of Brazilian former player José Carlos Bauer, who saw him in Lourenço Marques in 1960. Eusébio could run 100 metres in under 11 seconds. Although he preferred playing with the right side foot, Eusébio could use the left side just as well. At times, Eusébio would surprise opponents with his dribbling ability, seemingly, a talent he preferred to keep secret. Bauer recommended Eusébio first to his former club, São Paulo, but the Tricolor turned him down.

Bauer had been asked by his former coach at São Paulo, Béla Guttmann, to keep an eye out for talented players during a ten-week tour to Africa, and when São Paulo could not afford the asking price for Eusébio, Bauer then recommended him to Guttmann, who was coaching Benfica at the time. Guttman moved quickly and signed the then-19-year-old for Benfica.

The move was controversial; Sporting Lourenço Marques was a subsidiary of Sporting CP, and the two rivals disputed the legality of the transfer. According to Eusébio: "I used to play in Sporting's feeder club in Mozambique. Benfica wanted to pay me in a contract to go while Sporting wanted to take me [to Portugal] as a junior player for experience with no monetary reward. Benfica made a nice approach. They went to speak to my mum, my brother, and offered €1,000 for three years. My brother asked for double and they paid it. They signed the contract with my mother and she got the money."

By 15 December 1960, Eusébio arrived at Lisbon and was sent to Lagos, in the Algarve, with Benfica fearing a kidnapping operation by Sporting rivals. During his transfer he was codenamed Ruth Malosso. He remained there for 12 days, until the transfer upheaval calmed down. While he stayed in a hotel room he was warned for possible run-overs. Eusébio considered leaving Portugal, but his mother convinced him to stay.

Benfica registered Eusébio only in May the next year, and he made his first appearance for them against Atlético Clube de Portugal in a friendly game on 23 May 1961. He scored a hat-trick in a 4–2 victory. His debut in an official match was on 1 June 1961, against Vitória de Setúbal, in the third round second leg of the 1960–61 Taça de Portugal. The game was controversially scheduled for the day after the European Cup final against Barcelona and the Portuguese Football Federation did not postpone it. As the first team was returning from Bern, Benfica played with the reserve squad and was defeated 1–4. Eusébio scored a goal and missed a penalty (the first of only five he missed throughout his career), but this was not enough to win the round (4–5 on aggregate). On 10 June 1961, Eusébio played for the first time in the Primeira Divisão, the last match day against Belenenses, where he scored a goal in a 4–0 win. On 15 June, Benfica played the final of the invitational Tournoi de Paris against Pelé's Santos, and in the beginning of the second half, with Benfica down 0–4, Béla Guttmann decided to bring Eusébio from the bench to substitute Santana. Shortly after coming in, Santos reached 0–5. However, between the 63rd and the 80th minute, Eusébio scored 3 goals and suffered a foul inside the penalty area, the penalty taker, José Augusto, failed to score though. The game finished 6–3 for Santos, with Eusébio being on the cover of the famed French sporting newspaper L'Équipe.

His following season was the one where he started to gain global recognition among football fans and critics alike. He scored 12 goals in 17 league matches, and even though the club finished third, they won the Taça de Portugal against Vitória de Setúbal, with Eusébio scoring two goals in the final. In that same season, he won the European Cup, also scoring two goals in the final against Real Madrid in a 5–3 result to Benfica. Due to his fine form during the season, he finished second in the 1962 Ballon d'Or, in his first complete season as a professional. In October 1963, he was selected to represent the FIFA team in the "Golden Anniversary" of The Football Association at Wembley Stadium.

Benfica were also European Cup runners-up in 1963, 1965 and 1968. In the 1968 defeat to the English league champions Manchester United at Wembley Stadium, with the scores 1–1, he came close to winning the game for Benfica in the dying seconds of the game, only to have his shot saved by Alex Stepney. Despite this, and the fact that the English side went on to win 4–1 in extra time, he openly congratulated Stepney for his efforts throughout the game, stopping to applaud Stepney, as he threw the ball back into play.

He received a number of individual accolades and awards while playing for Benfica. He was the 1965 European Footballer of the Year (Ballon d'Or) and finished as runner-up twice, in 1962 and 1966, and in 1968 was the first winner of the Golden Boot Award, as Europe's leading scorer, a feat he repeated five years later. He was the Portuguese First Division's top scorer seven times (1964, 1965, 1966, 1967, 1968, 1970 and 1973), helping Benfica to win 11 Primeira Liga (1960–61, 1962–63, 1963–64, 1964–65, 1966–67, 1967–68, 1968–69, 1970–71, 1971–72, 1972–73 and 1974–75), 5 Portuguese Cup wins (1961–62, 1963–64, 1968–69, 1969–70 and 1971–72), 1 European Cup win (1961–62) and 3 European Cup finals (1962–63, 1964–65 and 1967–68).

Eusébio scored 473 goals in 440 official matches for Benfica, including 317 goals in 301 Primeira Liga matches, and 59 goals in 78 matches of UEFA club competitions. Overall, he scored 727 goals in 715 matches wearing Benfica's jersey.

Later career

In 1976–77 and 1977–78, Eusébio played for two smaller Portuguese clubs, Beira-Mar, in the first division, and União de Tomar, in the Second Division.

He also played in the North American Soccer League (NASL), for three different teams, from 1975 to 1977: Boston Minutemen (1975), Toronto Metros-Croatia (1976), and the Las Vegas Quicksilvers (1977). His most successful season in the NASL was in 1976 with Toronto Metros-Croatia. He scored the winning goal in their 3–0 victory at the Soccer Bowl '76 to win the NASL title. The same year, he played ten games for Monterrey in the Mexican league.

The following season (1977), he signed for the Las Vegas Quicksilvers. By this time, injuries had taken their toll on the Black Panther, and he was constantly receiving medical treatment whilst playing for the Quicksilvers. During the season, he only managed to score two goals.

Although his knees robbed him of his ability to continue in the NASL, Eusébio wanted to continue to play soccer. He found a home in 1978 with the New Jersey Americans of the second-tier American Soccer League (ASL). He went on to play five games for the Buffalo Stallions during the 1979–80 Major Indoor Soccer League season. He retired in 1979 and formed part of the technical committee of the Portugal national football team.

International career
Eusébio was the leading scorer for his country, with 41 goals in 64 matches, until Pauleta equalled and surpassed his record against Latvia on 12 October 2005. Eusébio was also the most capped Portuguese player from 1972, until Nené made his 64th cap against Yugoslavia on 2 June 1984 in a friendly match, breaking Eusébio's record during the UEFA Euro 1984 on 20 June against Romania. He made his debut for the Portugal national team against Luxembourg on 8 October 1961, a match his country lost 4–2, with the player scoring his country's first goal in the match.

1966 World Cup

After Portugal qualified for the 1966 World Cup, they were drawn in Group 3, alongside Bulgaria, Hungary and the reigning champions Brazil. After a modest performance against Hungary in the first game, Eusébio scored a goal against Bulgaria. Topping the group with two wins, the team would play against the Brazilians for the final group match. With an injured Pelé, Portugal had no trouble in defeating them with two goals from Eusébio, including a famous volley from a tight angle after a corner kick. The result meant Brazil's early elimination.

In the quarter-final, Portugal played North Korea, who had defeated and eliminated Italy in the group stage. After trailing 0–3 in the 25th minute, Eusébio proceeded to score four consecutive goals, two before half time and two in the first fifteen minutes of the second half. His fourth goal in that match came from a penalty when two North Korean players tackled him after a fast run Eusébio had made from the middle of the Portuguese half to the opposition's penalty area. Portugal came back to win 5–3.

In the semi-final match Portugal would have to face England. There was controversy about where the match would be hosted. Goodison Park in Liverpool was the original venue for the game. However, due to intervention from the English officials, the venue changed to Wembley. It was rumoured that this had happened because of fear from English officials of the Portuguese performance and embarrassment if England lost in their own country with a debuting team. Portugal had to make a last-minute train trip from Liverpool to London. Throughout the game Eusébio was closely marked by England's defensive midfielder Nobby Stiles, but still managed to score Portugal's only goal from the penalty spot in the 82nd minute, ending yet-to-be broken records of seven consecutive clean sheets and 708 minutes without conceding a goal for the English team. After scoring the penalty, Eusébio went on to catch the ball and saluted Gordon Banks. The goal was not enough to nullify Bobby Charlton's two earlier goals. António Simões had a last-minute chance only for Stiles to make it into a corner. Portugal lost 1–2 and Eusébio famously walked off the pitch in tears, being comforted by both his teammates and opponents. The game is known as the Jogo das Lágrimas (Game of Tears) in Portugal.

In the third place match, Portugal played against the Soviet Union. In the 12th minute after a handball inside the area, Eusébio scored the opening goal (his ninth and final World Cup goal) from the penalty spot. Although Lev Yashin guessed the side in which the ball would go, he was powerless to save it. Again and as he had done before with Banks, Eusébio went to salute his friend Yashin after he had scored. Portugal won the game 2–1 to what remains their best ever World Cup participation, and the best performance by a team on its debut since Italy's victory in 1934.

In addition to winning the Golden Boot (with nine goals) for the 1966 World Cup, Eusébio also set a record that year for the most penalties scored (shoot-out not included), with four. Eusébio's four goals against North Korea in the quarter-final match also helped Portugal tie the record for largest deficit overcome in a win (three goals, equaling Austria in 1954) and he became the fifth player to score as many goals in a FIFA World Cup match, a record he jointly held until Oleg Salenko scored five in the 1994 World Cup. The English were so impressed by Eusébio's performances that his waxwork was immediately added to the Madame Tussauds in London. He also received the BBC Overseas Sports Personality of the Year for 1966.

Personal life

Eusébio was a devout Roman Catholic and married Flora Claudina Burheim on 8 October 1965. They had two daughters together, Carla Elisa Bruheim da Silva Ferreira (born 1968) and Sandra Judite Bruheim da Silva Ferreira (born 1969).

Death
Eusébio died at his home on 5 January 2014 of heart failure, aged 71. Many well-known people from the football world expressed their condolences and praise, including his contemporaries Franz Beckenbauer and Bobby Charlton. The Portuguese Football Federation made a statement and said that a moment of silence was to be observed in Portuguese football matches. There were tributes from Cristiano Ronaldo, Luís Figo, José Mourinho, Carlos Queiroz, FIFA President Sepp Blatter UEFA president Michel Platini, Greg Dyke, and former President of Mozambique and childhood friend Joaquim Chissano. 

Following Eusébio's death, the Portuguese government declared three days of national mourning. Hundreds of thousands paid tribute to him. On 6 January 2014, a mass was held at the Igreja do Seminário do Largo da Luz. On 9 January, one of his wishes was granted as his coffin was transported around the field of the Estádio da Luz. Three days later, his statue (inaugurated on his 50th birthday) at the Praça Centenarium was transformed into a memorial. Hours later, the name "Eusébio" was on the back of every Benfica players' shirts during "O Clássico".

Precisely one year after his death, the avenue in front of the Estádio da Luz was renamed Avenida Eusébio da Silva Ferreira, becoming its new address. On 3 July, his remains were moved to the National Pantheon, where notable Portuguese personalities are buried. Parliament voted unanimously for him to be interred there. Eusébio was the first footballer to be buried at the Pantheon.

In September 2019, Eusébio was, along with Maria Mutola, referred by Pope Francis as an example of perseverance, during the latter's visit to Mozambique. Eusébio has been called "Africa's first great footballer" and "Africa's greatest-ever player".

Career statistics

Club

International

Honours

Sporting de Lourenço Marques
Campeonato Provincial de Moçambique: 1960

Benfica
Primeira Liga (11): 1960–61, 1962–63, 1963–64, 1964–65, 1966–67, 1967–68, 1968–69, 1970–71, 1971–72, 1972–73, 1974–75
Taça de Portugal (5): 1961–62, 1963–64, 1968–69, 1969–70, 1971–72
Taça de Honra de Lisboa (9): 1962–63, 1964–65, 1966–67, 1967–68, 1968–69, 1971–72, 1972–73, 1973–74, 1974–75
Taça Ribeiro dos Reis: 1963–64, 1965–66, 1970–71
European Cup: 1961–62
Intercontinental Cup runner-up: 1961, 1962

Toronto Metros-Croatia
NASL: 1976

Portugal
FIFA World Cup third place: 1966

Individual

Ballon d'Or: 1965
World Soccer World XI: 1965
FIFA XI: 1963, 1967
European Golden Shoe: 1968 (first winner), 1973
Bola de Prata (7): 1964, 1965, 1966, 1967, 1968, 1970, 1973
European Cup top scorer: 1965, 1966, 1968
Taça de Portugal top scorer: 1962, 1964, 1965, 1969, 1972
FIFA World Cup Golden Boot: 1966
FIFA World Cup Bronze Ball: 1966
FIFA World Cup All-Star Team: 1966
Portuguese Footballer of the Year: 1970, 1973
BBC Overseas Sports Personality of the Year: 1966
IFFHS Legends

Portuguese Golden Ball career award
FIFA International Football Hall of Champions
PFA Merit Award
FIFA 100
UEFA Jubilee Awards – Golden Player Portugal
UEFA President's Award
France Football's World Cup Top-100
Planète Foot's 50 Meilleurs Joueurs du Monde
Voetbal International's Wereldsterren
Guerin Sportivo's I 50 Grandi del Secolo
World Soccer's Selection of the 100 Greatest Footballers of All Time
Placar's 100 Craques do Século
Venerdì's 100 Magnifici
Golden Foot Legends Award: 2003
IFFHS World's Best Player of the Century (9th place)
FIFA Order of Merit: 1994

Orders
 Grand Cross of the Order of Prince Henry
 Grand Cross of the Order of Merit

See also

 List of footballers with 500 or more goals
 Eusébio Cup

References
General
 

Specific

Further reading

Filmography
Juan de Orduña, Eusébio, la Pantera Negra (1973)
Filipe Ascensão, Eusébio: História de uma Lenda (2017)
António Pinhão Botelho, Ruth (2018)

External links

 
 NASL/MISL stats
 
 
 

1942 births
2014 deaths
Sportspeople from Maputo
Association football forwards
Primeira Liga players
S.L. Benfica footballers
Ballon d'Or winners
UEFA Golden Players
Portugal international footballers
1966 FIFA World Cup players
FIFA 100
North American Soccer League (1968–1984) players
Boston Minutemen players
Liga MX players
C.F. Monterrey players
Toronto Blizzard (1971–1984) players
S.C. Beira-Mar players
Las Vegas Quicksilver players
Liga Portugal 2 players
U.F.C.I. Tomar players
American Soccer League (1933–1983) players
New Jersey Americans (ASL) players
Major Indoor Soccer League (1978–1992) players
Buffalo Stallions players
Expatriate soccer players in the United States
Expatriate footballers in Mexico
Expatriate soccer players in Canada
Mozambican emigrants to Portugal
Mozambican footballers
Portuguese footballers
Portuguese expatriate footballers
Portuguese expatriate sportspeople in the United States
Portuguese expatriate sportspeople in Canada
Portuguese expatriate sportspeople in Mexico
Portuguese people of Mozambican descent
Portuguese sportspeople of Angolan descent
Portuguese Roman Catholics
Golden Globes (Portugal) winners
UEFA Champions League winning players
UEFA Champions League top scorers
BBC Sports Personality World Sport Star of the Year winners
Black Portuguese sportspeople